CHI-California Healthcare Institute is a private, non-profit public policy research and advocacy organization, representing more than 250 universities, academic research centers, biotechnology, and medical device companies.  Founded in 1993, and based in La Jolla, California, CHI has offices in Washington, D.C., and Sacramento, California.  CHI publishes an annual California Biomedical Industry report, providing data on the scope and scale of academic and commercial life sciences research and development within the state.  In 2008, the industry employed more than 270,000 Californians and produced revenues in excess of $75 billion.

FDA device approval reform

CHI published a study, Competitiveness and Regulation: The FDA and the Future of America’s Biomedical Industry, which concluded that device approval times had increased, that approval times in the European Union were faster than those in the U.S., and that "inefficiency at the FDA had resulted in American inventions made available to patients and physicians in other countries first ... [and] has pushed jobs and revenues offshore."

This report was presented at an oversight hearing of the House of Representatives, Committee on Energy and Commerce, on FDA medical device regulation.

The report defended the expedited approval process for devices and said that "Devices, in contrast, may be altered in minor ways -- switching to a new metal alloy, installing a longer-lasting battery, using a better polymer -- so that the effects on the product's safety and efficacy profile are predictable."

The Democratic members of the committee submitted the report to editors of major peer-reviewed journals for evaluation.

CHI Board of Directors
CHI's Chairman is Carl Hull, president and chief executive officer, Gen-Probe, Inc.; its President and CEO is David Gollaher.

Board members include:

CHI Membership
Members include the University of California, Amgen, University of California, Irvine, Biogen Idec, Stanford, Amgen, Genentech and Gilead Sciences.

References

External links
 

Organizations based in California